Cedar Point is a city in Chase County, Kansas, United States.  As of the 2020 census, the population of the city was 22.  It is about 5 miles east of Florence and 0.5 miles south of U.S. Route 50 highway.

History

Early history

For many millennia, the Great Plains of North America was inhabited by nomadic Native Americans.  From the 16th century to 18th century, the Kingdom of France claimed ownership of large parts of North America.  In 1762, after the French and Indian War, France secretly ceded New France to Spain, per the Treaty of Fontainebleau.

19th century

In 1802, Spain returned most of the land to France.  In 1803, most of the land for modern day Kansas was acquired by the United States from France as part of the 828,000 square mile Louisiana Purchase for 2.83 cents per acre.

In 1806, Zebulon Pike led the Pike Expedition westward from St Louis, Missouri, of which part of their journey followed the Cottonwood River through Chase County near the current city of Cedar Point.

In 1854, the Kansas Territory was organized, then in 1861 Kansas became the 34th U.S. state.  In 1855, Marion County was established within the Kansas Territory, which included the land for modern day Cedar Point.

In 1862, Cedar Point was founded. The first post office in Cedar Point was established in 1862.

In 1867, a log dam was built across the Cottonwood River, and a wooden-frame mill was constructed for sawing lumber.  The following year (1868) it was converted to grind flour and named Cedar Point Mill.  In 1870, the name was changed to Drinkwater & Schriver Mill.  In 1871, construction of the current stone structure was started, then completed in 1875.  In 1884, the log dam was replaced by a stone dam.

In 1871, the Atchison, Topeka and Santa Fe Railway built a main line east-west and built a nearby station named Cedar Grove in the valley north of Cedar Point. In 1996, it merged with Burlington Northern Railroad and renamed to the current BNSF Railway.  Most locals still refer to this railroad as the "Santa Fe".

Geography
Cedar Point is located at  (38.260888, -96.821662), in the scenic Flint Hills of the Great Plains.

Area attractions
Cedar Point has two listings on the National Register of Historic Places (NRHP).
 1875 Cedar Point Mill (NRHP).
 1916 Cottonwood River Pratt Truss Bridge (NRHP).  Located west of the city.

Demographics

Cedar Point is part of the Emporia Micropolitan Statistical Area.

2010 census
As of the census of 2010, there were 28 people, 13 households, and 5 families residing in the city. The racial makeup of the city was 96.4% White and 3.6% from two or more races.

There were 13 households, of which 23.1% had children under the age of 18 living with them, 30.8% were married couples living together, 7.7% had a male householder with no wife present, and 61.5% were non-families. 46.2% of all households were made up of individuals, and 38.5% had someone living alone who was 65 years of age or older. The average household size was 2.15 and the average family size was 3.60.

The median age in the city was 51.5 years. 28.6% of residents were under the age of 18; 0% were between the ages of 18 and 24; 10.7% were from 25 to 44; 32% were from 45 to 64; and 28.6% were 65 years of age or older. The gender makeup of the city was 53.6% male and 46.4% female.

2000 census

As of the census of 2000, there were 53 people, 22 households, and 13 families residing in the city. The racial makeup of the city was 94.34% White, 1.89% Native American, and 3.77% from two or more races.

There were 22 households, out of which 13.6% had children under the age of 18 living with them, 50.0% were married couples living together, 13.6% had a female householder with no husband present, and 36.4% were non-families. 31.8% of all households were made up of individuals, and 13.6% had someone living alone who was 65 years of age or older. The average household size was 2.41 and the average family size was 3.00.

In the city, the population was spread out, with 22.6% under the age of 18, 17.0% from 18 to 24, 18.9% from 25 to 44, 24.5% from 45 to 64, and 17.0% who were 65 years of age or older. The median age was 38 years. For every 100 females, there were 96.3 males. For every 100 females age 18 and over, there were 95.2 males.

As of 2000 the median income for a household in the city was $28,750, and the median income for a family was $36,250. Males had a median income of $40,000 versus $42,500 for females. The per capita income for the city was $16,102. There were no families and 3.6% of the population living below the poverty line, including no under eighteens and none of those over 64.

Government
The Cedar Point consists of a mayor and three council members.  The council meets once a month.

Education
The community is served by Chase County USD 284 public school district.  It has two schools.
 Chase County Junior/Senior High School, 600 Main St in Cottonwood Falls.
 Chase County Elementary School, 401 Maple St in Cottonwood Falls.

Cedar Point schools were closed through school unification. The Cedar Point High School mascot was Cedar Point Bronchos.

Media

Print
 Marion County Record, official newspaper for Marion County.
 Hillsboro Free Press, free newspaper for greater Marion County area.

Infrastructure

Transportation
U.S. Route 50 highway and BNSF Railway passes east-west near the city.

Utilities
 Internet
 Satellite is provided by HughesNet, StarBand, WildBlue.
 TV
 Satellite is provided by DirecTV, Dish Network.
 Terrestrial is provided by regional digital TV stations.
 Electricity
 Rural is provided by Butler REC.
 Trash is provided by City of Florence.

See also
 Cedar Township, Chase County, Kansas
 Fort Drinkwater
 National Register of Historic Places listings in Chase County, Kansas
 1875 Cedar Point Mill (Drinkwater & Schriver Mill)
 1916 Cottonwood River Pratt Truss Bridge
 Cottonwood River and Great Flood of 1951
 April 1956 tornado outbreak

References

Further reading

External links

 Cedar Point - Directory of Public Officials
 Chase County Chamber of Commerce
 Cedar Point - A "Quiet" town of Chase County, Kansas, History and photographs.
 Cedar Point Mill and Dam between 1900 and 1920
 Cedar Point city map, KDOT

Cities in Chase County, Kansas
Cities in Kansas
Emporia, Kansas micropolitan area
1862 establishments in Kansas